Pre-Life Crisis is the debut album by American rapper and record producer Count Bass D, released on September 26, 1995. Its songs mostly demonstrate Count Bass D's capability of playing multiple instruments (although several other musicians play instruments on this album), and the songs mainly consist of saxophones, smooth basslines, 808 drums, and electric guitars. Because of the album's progressive styles, it was difficult to market and it soon went out of print. It has, however, received a cult following among underground hip-hop fans. The album's only single "Sandwiches (I Got a Feeling)" received moderate radio and video airplay, in addition to being released on vinyl and CD, along with the B-side "T-Boz Tried to Talk to Me." The album is now out of print.

Track listing

References

External links
 Count Bass D-Pre Life Crisis at Discogs

1995 debut albums
Count Bass D albums